An electrolarynx, sometimes referred to as a "throat back", is a medical device about the size of a small electric razor used to produce clearer speech by those people who have lost their voice box, usually due to cancer of the larynx. The most common device is a handheld, battery-operated device pressed against the skin under the mandible which produces vibrations to allow speech; other variations include a device similar to the "talk box" electronic music device, which delivers the basis of the speech sound via a tube placed in the mouth.  Earlier non-electric devices were called mechanical larynxes. Along with developing esophageal voice, using a speech synthesizer, or undergoing a surgical procedure, the electrolarynx serves as a mode of speech recovery for laryngectomy patients.

The Voice Quality Symbol for electrolaryngeal phonation in speech is И, approximating the symbol for electricity.

Overview
Initially, the pneumatic mechanical larynx was developed in the 1920s by Western Electric. It did not run on electricity, and was flawed in that it produced a strong voice.  Electrolarynxes were introduced in the 1940s, at a time when esophageal speech was being promoted as the best course in speech recovery; however, since that technique is difficult to master, the electrolarynx became quite popular.  Since then, medical procedures, such as the tracheo-oesophageal puncture, and the rarely performed laryngeal transplantation surgery, have been created to enable speech without continued dependence on a handheld device.

The use of an electrolarynx can cause social issues, for instance difficulty ordering food, drinks, or other items in noisy environments; or, when answering a telephone, having the caller respond, "Am I talking to a computer?"

However, quality-of-life improvements due to electrolarynx usage are generally significant.  One user states: 

Traditional electrolarynxes produce a monotone buzz that the user articulates into speech sounds, resulting in the characteristic "robotlike" voice quality.  However, in the 1990s, research and commercial multi-tone devices began to be developed, including discrete-tone devices using multiple-position switches or multiple buttons; as well as variable-tone devices controlled by single pressure-sensitive buttons, trackballs, gyroscopes, touchpad-like input devices, or even electrical detection of the movement of neck muscles.  In addition to allowing speakers of non-tonal languages such as English to have a more natural speaking voice, some of these newer devices have allowed speakers of tonal languages such as Mandarin Chinese to speak more intelligibly.

Notable fictional users
Fictional characters notable for their use of an electrolarynx include:

 Agents of "Leviathan" on Agent Carter
 Alpha 60 from Alphaville
 Charlie in Mad Max
 Electrolarynx Guy (Jack Axelrod) on My Name Is Earl
 Emilio Sanchez, one of the residents of the Lawrence Hilton Jacobs housing project on The PJs
 Gray Baker in Dead Again
 Heathrow, Madea's brother in Tyler Perry'''s A Madea Family Funeral Komtuan, the crime lord from the film Ong-Bak: Muay Thai Warrior, notable as a speaker of a tonal language being understood despite using a traditional monotone electrolarynx
 Ned Gerblanski from South Park Sawyer the Cleaner from Black Lagoon Sheriff Jerry/Angela Baker in Return to Sleepaway Camp Smokie Martling, a parody of Jackie Martling from The Howard Stern Show The Smoking Family from Chewin' The Fat Stemroach (David Bradley) on Ideal WWE wrestler Kane, for his first two years in the company (1998–1999)
 Zimos from Saints Row The Third Evil Troy from Community (TV series)''

See also
 Esophageal speech
 
 Silent speech interface

References

Laryngology
Human voice